Eurie Lee Hong is an American geneticist. She is the Vice President of Genomics at AncestryDNA.

Education 
Hong earned a bachelor of science in biological sciences from Stanford University. She completed a Ph.D. in molecular genetics and cell biology at University of Chicago. As a graduate student in Douglas K. Bishop's laboratory, Hong worked on the biochemical characterization of the yeast meiotic Dmc1 protein.

Career and research 
Hong was a biocuration scientist and head of scientific curation at the Saccharomyces Genome Database at Stanford University School of Medicine.  She was later a senior research scientist at the Stanford School of Medicine and project manager of the ENCODE Data Coordination Center at Stanford. In 2015, Hong joined Ancestry.com. As the director of genomics at AncestryDNA, she leads a team of population geneticists, computational biologists, statistical geneticists, and bioinformatic analysts to she develop algorithms and integrate genomic data. She researches the identification of biological insights from genomics and genomic data through computational and bioinformatic solutions.

Personal life 
Hong is married and has a daughter.

References

External links
 

Living people
Year of birth missing (living people)
American geneticists
American women geneticists
21st-century American scientists
21st-century American women scientists
Stanford University alumni
University of Chicago alumni